The Southwest District is a high school conference of the Virginia High School League that includes schools from southwestern Virginia, United States.  The Southwest District was established in the former AA Region IV.

The AA Highlands District dissolved in 2007, with Abingdon and Marion joining the Southwest District.  The AA Southwest District had several changes for the 2013–2014 school year during the overall VHSL realignment.  Carroll County, a member of the new Group 4A, moved to the AA River Ridge District.  Virginia High School and Lebanon High School joined from the dissolved A Clinch Mountain District. Graham High School (Bluefield, Virginia) recently joined the district after 6 years with the A Mountain Empire District due to the new alignment plan mapped out by the VHSL.

Abingdon is a member of the new Group 3A while the other schools are members of the new Group 2A.  Abingdon left the Southwest District in the 2017 - 2018 School Year for the new Mountain 7 District.  These schools are part of the new region system after conferences fell by the wayside.  Region 2 D is the new classification.

Member schools

Marion Scarlet Hurricane of Marion, VA
Graham G-Men of Bluefield, VA
Richlands Blue Tornado of Richlands, VA
Tazewell Bulldogs of Tazewell, VA
Virginia Bearcats of Bristol, VA

Virginia High School League